This is a list of the Italian Ministers of Justice since 1946. The Minister of Justice is a senior member of the Italian Cabinet and leads the Ministry of Justice.

The first Italian Minister of Justice is Giovanni Battista Cassinis, member of the Historical Right, who held the office in 1861 in the government of Camillo Benso, Count of Cavour; while the longest-serving minister was Alfredo Rocco, who served in the fascist government of Benito Mussolini from 1925 until 1932. The current minister is Carlo Nordio, appointed on 22 October 2022 in the government of Giorgia Meloni.

List of Ministers of Justice

Kingdom of Italy

Parties

Coalitions

Ministers

Italian Republic

Parties
1946–1994:

1994–present:

Coalitions

Ministers

Timeline

Italian Republic

See also

 Keeper of the seals

References

External links
 Ministry of Justice 
 Ministry of Justice  (Archive)

Justice